Rail splitter or railsplitter may refer to:
 A person who splits logs for building fences
Nickname for Abraham Lincoln, U.S. President
 Lincoln Memorial Railsplitters, the athletic program of Lincoln Memorial University, an NCAA Division II school in Harrogate, Tennessee named for President Lincoln
 Rail Splitter Wind Farm, a 100-MW generating complex located in Illinois and named in honor of President Lincoln
 Edward R. Madigan State Fish and Wildlife Area, formerly known as Railsplitter State Park.
 84th Division (United States), World War I and II unit nicknamed the "railsplitters"
Voltage divider, an electric circuit. Typically with the intent to establish a virtual ground.